Balloo is a small village in the northeast Netherlands. It is located in the municipality of Aa en Hunze, Drenthe, about 5 km east of Assen.

The village has a population of around 150.

Transportation

The nearest railway station is Assen railway station. The nearest bus service is provided along Rolde's Asserstraat, to the south of Balloo. Buses that can be boarded here are:
 Bus 21 – Assen to Emmen
 Bus 24 – Assen to Stadskanaal
 Bus 53 – Assen to Gieten

Dolmen 
The hunebed (dolmen)  is located near Balloo. It is one of the larger dolmen. It contains nine capstones and 19 side stones. In 1918, it was chaotic and most of the stones had fallen down. In 1978, the dolmen has been reconstructed. The sixth capstone contains cup-marks which have also been founded in Denmark and Schleswig-Holstein. The meaning of the cup-marks and its creation are still a mystery.

Gallery

References

Populated places in Drenthe
Aa en Hunze